The 5th Bengal European Cavalry was a cavalry regiment of the British East India Company, created in 1858 and disbanded in 1859.

The regiment was originally raised in Bengal by the East India Company in 1858 as the 5th Bengal European Light Cavalry, for service in the Indian Mutiny; the "European" in the name indicated that it was manned by white soldiers, not Indian sowars. During the Mutiny, a major of the regiment, Charles John Stanley Gough, received the Victoria Cross.

As with all other "European" units of the Company, they were placed under the command of the Crown following the end of the Mutiny in 1858, but the regiment was disbanded rather than be transferred into the British Army. It had been one of the most outspoken during the "White mutiny" which occurred when proposals were first made to transfer the "European Regiments" into the British Army. The mutiny had successfully achieved concessions from the British Government allowing men to opt for free discharges and passage home as an alternative to transferring into the British Army.

References

Honourable East India Company regiments
Military units and formations established in 1858
Military units and formations disestablished in 1859
Bengal European
Bengal Presidency
Bengal European Cavalry